Carnival Liberty is a  operated by Carnival Cruise Line. Built by Fincantieri at its Monfalcone shipyard in Friuli-Venezia Giulia, northern Italy, she was christened by actress Mira Sorvino in Civitavecchia, Italy, on July 19, 2005. Located by the midship pool on the Lido deck, it is used to show movies, sporting events, concerts and other ship programming.

Incidents

Norovirus outbreak
On November 3, 2006, Carnival Liberty departed Rome, Italy, to Fort Lauderdale (Port Everglades). During the 16-day transatlantic voyage, over 700 people contracted the contagious norovirus illness.  On the morning hours of November 15, Carnival Cruise Lines announced it would shorten the next cruise by two days for an extensive cleaning. Originally, the next cruise was scheduled to depart on November 19 for a six-day cruise. The November 19 cruise was rescheduled to depart Fort Lauderdale on November 21 for a four-day cruise using new ports-of-call.  Safety measures were also enacted on a few of the future cruises to prevent further contamination. These safety measures included fully suspending self-service on the buffet lines. When the first cruise after the outbreak ended on November 25, fewer than 60 passengers were reported to have contracted the norovirus.

Cuban refugee rescue
On the August 22, 2014 sailing, the Carnival Liberty was forced by the storm system that would become Hurricane Cristobal to use a rerouted itinerary (St. Thomas, U.S. Virgin Islands, St. Maarten, San Juan, Puerto Rico, and Grand Turk Island) along a course that would take it close to Cuba.  On August 23, a distress signal was received and a small, makeshift styrofoam raft was observed near the ship.  The Liberty reversed course and proceeded to pull 11 Cuban refugees from the raft who had requested rescue in the worsening sea conditions.  Hundreds of passengers observed the rescue, conducted off the port side.  The raft was abandoned in the water as the ship continued on its modified course toward St. Thomas, U.S. Virgin Islands, scheduled for arrival on August 25.  The U.S. Coast Guard later ordered a rendezvous where the refugees were offloaded onto a Coast Guard cutter for transfer back to Cuba overnight on the 23rd and 24th.

Engine room fire in St Thomas

On September 7, 2015, Carnival Cruise Lines confirmed in a statement that the U.S. Coast Guard had been called to provide assistance to the ship due to an engine room fire. The incident occurred while the ship was alongside in St. Thomas in the US Virgin Islands. All hotel services on the ship including air conditioning, elevators, toilets and galleys were fully functional and the ship's normal array of activities including entertainment and dining proceeded as normal after passengers were allowed to re-board on the night of September 7.

References

Notes

Bibliography

External links

Official website

2004 ships
Liberty
Ships built in Monfalcone
Ships built by Fincantieri